Setsu and Shinobu Ito are Japanese designers. Their work is stored as permanent collections in the Modern Art Museums in Munich and Milan.

Fellow of the Research Center for Advanced Science and Technology at the University of Tokyo (Setsu Ito) Visiting Researcher (Shinobu Ito), Professor of The University of Tsukuba (2020–present, Setsu Ito, Japan) Visiting Professor at Tama Art University (Shinobu Ito), Contracted Professor at the Faculty of Design, Polytechnic University of Milan (both).

Biography 

Setsu and Shinobu Ito opened their design studio in Milan in 1997.

Setsu Ito, who graduated at the University of Tsukuba in Japan (1989), started collaborating with Alessandro Mendini in the Studio Alchimia and then with Angelo Mangiarotti.

Shinobu Ito graduated in textile design at Tama Art University in Tokyo (1988) and started her career for CBS Sony (present: Sony Music Entertainment) in Sony Creative Products. Heavily influenced as a student by postmodern Italian design, Shinobu later moved to Italy to attend the Domus Academy in Milan, where she met her future husband and business partner, Setsu Ito, who at the time was working as a tutor at the school. The pair were attracted to the city and in 1997 they established a studio in Milan.

Their works have been presented and exhibited around the world and also have been published in many books and magazines.

They also received design awards such as: "Compasso d'Oro" (2011, Italy), "Compasso d'Oro Menzione d'Onore" (2011, Italy), "Red Dot Award Best of the Best" (2016, Germany, Singapore), "Design Plus" (2016, Germany), "NY NOW Best Product" (2017, USA), "The Good Design Award" (2001, Japan), "Mastro della Pietra" (2019, Italy) and many other international design awards.

Some projects are a part of the permanent collection of the Die Neue Sammlung Design Museum in Munich (Germany) and the Triennale Design Museum in Milan (Italy). They are visiting professors of Domus Academy (2000–present, Italy), Polytechnic University of Milan (2006-2007, Setsu Ito / 2016-Present, Both, Italy), Istituto Universitario di Architettura di Venezia (2009, Italy), IED / Istituto Europeo di Design of Milan (1999–present, Italy), Raffles Milano (2017–present, Italy) and the University of Tsukuba (2020–present, Setsu Ito, Japan), Tama Art University (2018–present, Shinobu Ito, Japan). Fellow (2019–present, Setsu Ito) and Visiting Researcher (2018–present, Shinobu Ito) of the Research Center for Advanced Science & Technology at the University of Tokyo (Japan). They are members of the Associazione per il Disegno Industriale (Italy), board members of the Japan Fashion Color Association (Japan) and the Asia Pacific Designers Federation (China). They are judge of the International Design Awards including the International Forum Product Design Award (Germany), IAI Design Award (China).

Published a biography book “Setsu & Shinobu Ito_East-West Designer” (Logos Italy 2008).

Representative works / projects 
HOW -Stationery Collection (Nava_Italy) 2000 - 2006
A series of functional desktops and stationery with light and deep feeling in line with the shift to home offices in the IT era. Some of the products are a permanent collection of the Triennale Milano Design Museum and won a Good Design Award (2001, Japan)

ILY-I Interactive Armchair (Aisin_Japan) 2015
Developed a sofa-type personal mobility design that can be moved smartly from the elderly to young people in outdoor public facilities.It is equipped with an ultrasonic sensor and has an automatic braking system and light reaction function. With the addition of IoT functions, it aims to make home robots of furniture equipped with remote communication between families and health management functions.
Red Dot Award Best of the Best Award (2016, Germany, Singapore)

MY FUSION Collection long seller series Bowl and other Tableware object (Fratelli Guzzini) 2016
The world's first plastic three-color simultaneous mold and tableware series based on Guzzini's 3TECH technology, which led the development of post-war household plastic products. Expressed in a plastic container that is easy to use. Colors are inspired by the traditional Japanese lacquer articles.
DESIGN PLUS-Winner (2016, Germany)
NY NOW Award-Best New Product Winner (2016, USA)
Good Design Awards (2018, USA)

Permanent collection 
Triennale Design Museum in Milan (Italy)

Die Neue Sammlung Design Museum in Munich (Germany)

Major awards 
1999 - The Young & Design Award (Italy)

2001 - Good Design Award (2001, Japan), The Toyama Product Design Award / Toyama Design Award (Japan)

2007 - Melbourne Cup / Selected Main Character Graphic (Australia)

2008 - Interior lifestyle Tokyo Award 2008 / Guzzini Foodesign Japan (Japan)

2011 - Compasso d'oro (Italy)

2011 - Compasso d'oro honorable mention (Italy)

2016 - Milano Design Award 2016 / Best Engagement (Italy), Red Dot Award 2016 Best of the Best (Germany, Singapore), DESIGN PLUS (Germany), JPC Japan Package Design Award / Cosmetic Goods Award (Japan)

2017 - NY NOW Best Product (USA)

2018 - Good Design Awards (USA)

2019 - Mastro d'arte della pietra (Italy)

Publications 
 Setsu & Shinobu Ito_East & West Designer (Virginio Briatore, Logos, Italy)

 The international design yearbook 1998 (Richard Sapper, L. King, UK)

 50 products : innovations in design and materials (Mel Byars, Crans-Près-Céligny, Switzerland)

 The international design yearbook 2000 (Ingo Maurer, Susan Andrew, L. King, UK)

 The international design yearbook 2001 (Michele de Lucchi, L. King, UK)

 The eco-design handbook : a complete sourcebook for the home and office. (Alastair Fuad-Luke, Thames & Hudson, UK)

 The international design yearbook 2004 (Tom Dixon, L. King, UK)

 YOUNG ASIAN DESIGNERS (Daab, Denmark)

 New furniture design (Martin Rolshoven, Daab, Denmark)

 Package design in Japan 2005 biennial. vol. 11 (Rikuyosha Co., Japan)

 1000 designs : and where to find them (Jennifer Hudson, L. King, UK)

 Sekai no saishin chea dezain. (Toso, Japan)

 PLASTIC (Cristian Campos, Collins Design, USA)

 La Repubblica Grandi Guide - Arredamento & Design 2007-2008 (La Repubblica, Italy)

 The international design yearbook 2007 (Patricia Urquiola, Jennifer Hudson, L. King, UK)

 Process : 50 product designs from concept to manufacture (L.King, UK)

 Nihon dezain 50nen : Your next design. (Ei Shuppansha, Japan)

 Ri ben no shou gan she ji = Touch of design (La Vie, China)

 Il segno dei designer (Gianni Veneziano, Triennale Design Museum, Electa, Italy)

 Purodakuto dezaina dezain jimusho nihyakusanjuroku shuroku (Seibundo, Japan)

 LE LUCI E LA PIETRA (Giuseppe Coppola, Elect, Italy)

 La Repubblica Grandi Guide - Arredamento & Design 2010-2011 (La Repubblica, Italy)

 Exhibition space design (HI-DESIGN PUBLISHING, Gao di guo ji HI-DESIGN PUBLISHING., China)

 Biogenie : 99 people into design tales (Giulio Ceppi, Ezio Manzini, LISt Lab, Italy)

 WA : l'essenza del design giapponese (Rossella Menegazzo, Stefania Piotti, L'ippocampo, Italy)

 Maledetto Design (Alessandra Coppa, Centauria, Italy)

 Japanese Architects and Designers from Studio Mangiarotti (Maggioli Editore, Italy)

 Purodakuto dezain no hirogari : hikaku dezain bunkaron. (Kogyo Chosakai, Japan)

 Creators file-for living (Gyappu, Japan)

 Creators file-for living 2 (Gyappu, Japan)

 Tsukuba Design 1953 - 1991 (The Tsukuba University School of Art & Design Industrial Design, Japan)

 Tsukuba Design 2 (The Tsukuba University School of Art & Design Industrial Design, Japan)

 Italian Designer’s Book (JETRO, Japan)

 Le ricetta dei designer (Editrice Compositori, Italy)

 Le ricetta dei designer 2 (Editrice Compositori, ItalY)

 Pane e design (Editrice Compositori, Italy)

 Design al sangue (Editrice Compositori, Italy)

 Design al dente (Editrice Compositori, Italy)

 Stuzzicati dal design (Editrice Compositori, Italy)

 Una spina nel design (Editrice Compositori, Italy)

 Cavolo che design (Editrice Compositori, Italy)

 Multipli di cibo Foodesign Guzzini Made in Japan (BIEFFE, Italy, ASIN: B00QV9J08M)

References

External links 
 Studio I.T.O. Design
 Woman Made: Great Woman Designers.
 Process: 50 Product Designs From Concept To Manufacture.

Japanese multimedia artists
People from Yamaguchi Prefecture
Living people
Year of birth missing (living people)